Sir Owen Wynn, 3rd Baronet (1592–1660) inherited his title after the death of his brother Sir Richard Wynn, 2nd Baronet in the summer of 1649. He married Grace Williams, daughter of Hugh Williams, and niece of John Williams, Archbishop of York. Owen was succeeded at Gwydir by his son Sir Richard Wynn, 4th Baronet in 1660.

Notes

References

D.N.B., lxiii; Cal. Wynn (of Gwydir) Papers, passim; Clenennau Letters, i, Introduction
Hist. Gwydir Family, passim; W. R. Williams, Parl. Hist. of Wales, passim
E. Breeze, Kalendars of Gwynedd, passim; Cymm., xxxviii
The Welsh Review, v, 187–191; Trans. Caern. Hist. Soc., 1939, 37–46; J. E. Griffith, Pedigrees, 280–1
E. G. Jones, 'The Caernarvonshire Squires, 1558–1625' (unpublished M.A. thesis, University of Wales).

Further reading

1592 births
1660 deaths
Baronets in the Baronetage of England
People educated at Eton College
People educated at Westminster School, London
Alumni of St John's College, Cambridge
House of Cunedda
High Sheriffs of Caernarvonshire
High Sheriffs of Denbighshire